Yeğenli is a village in Silifke district of Mersin Province, Turkey. The population of Yeğenli is 700  as of 2010. The main crop of the village is tomatoes.

References

Villages in Silifke District